Juan Coello Ribera y Sandoval (23 December 1607 – 1655) was a Roman Catholic prelate who served as Bishop of Plasencia (1652–1655) and Bishop of Zamora (1639–1652).

Biography
Juan Coello Ribera y Sandoval was born in Villarejo de la Peñuela, Spain on 23 December 1607.
On 11 April 1639, he was appointed during the papacy of Pope Urban VIII as Bishop of Zamora.
On 16 October 1639, he was consecrated bishop by Diego Castejón Fonseca, Bishop Emeritus of Lugo, with Timoteo Pérez Vargas, Bishop of Ispahan, and Juan Alonso y Ocón, Bishop of Yucatán, serving as co-consecrators. 
On 11 December 1652, he was appointed during the papacy of Pope Julius III as Bishop of Plasencia.
He served as Bishop of Plasencia until his death in 1655.

References

External links and additional sources
 (for Chronology of Bishops) 
 (for Chronology of Bishops) 
 (for Chronology of Bishops)  
 (for Chronology of Bishops) 

17th-century Roman Catholic bishops in Spain
Bishops appointed by Pope Urban VIII
Bishops appointed by Pope Julius III
1607 births
1655 deaths